The Canton of Bellegarde-en-Marche is a former canton situated in the Creuse département and in the Limousin region of central France. It was disbanded following the French canton reorganisation which came into effect in March 2015. It consisted of 9 communes, which joined the canton of Aubusson in 2015. It had 2,599 inhabitants (2012).

Geography
A farming and woodland area, with the town of Bellegarde-en-Marche, in the arrondissement of Aubusson, at its centre. The altitude varies from 422m (Saint-Domet) to 727m (Mautes) with an average altitude of 576m.

The canton comprised 9 communes:

Bellegarde-en-Marche
Bosroger
Champagnat
La Chaussade
Lupersat
Mainsat
Mautes
Saint-Domet
Saint-Silvain-Bellegarde

Population

See also
 Arrondissements of the Creuse department
 Cantons of the Creuse department
 Communes of the Creuse department

References

Bellegarde-en-Marche
2015 disestablishments in France
States and territories disestablished in 2015